Pa Pong is a village and tambon (sub-district) of Sop Moei District, in Mae Hong Son Province, Thailand. In 2005 it had a population of 4,286. The tambon contains seven villages.

References

Tambon of Mae Hong Son province
Populated places in Mae Hong Son province